Carter Coal Company Store, also known as Consolidation Coal Company Store, is a historic company store building located at Caretta, McDowell County, West Virginia.  It was built about 1912 by the Carter Coal Company, and is a one-story brick commercial building on a stone foundation.  It has a gable roof.  The building was originally "T"-shaped, but wood frame additions built in 1922, spread the plan to an "L." . It ceased operating as a post office in August 2005.

It was listed on the National Register of Historic Places in 1992.

See also 
 Carter Coal Company Store (Coalwood, West Virginia)
 Carter v. Carter Coal Co.

References

Commercial buildings on the National Register of Historic Places in West Virginia
Commercial buildings completed in 1922
Commercial buildings completed in 1912
National Register of Historic Places in McDowell County, West Virginia
Post office buildings on the National Register of Historic Places in West Virginia
1912 establishments in West Virginia
Company stores in the United States